Bhagat Ki Kothi–Kamakhya Express is an Express train of the Indian Railways connecting  in Rajasthan and  in Assam. All the coaches are LHB coach. It is currently being operated with 15623/15624 train numbers on once a week basis.

Service

The 15623/Bhagat Ki Kothi–Kamakhya Express has an average speed of 46 km/hr and covers 2543 km in 55 hrs 35 mins. 15624/Kamakhya–Bhagat Ki Kothi Weekly Express has an average speed of 48 km/hr and covers  2543 km in 52 hrs 45 mins.

Route and halts 

The important halts of the train are :

RAJASTHAN
 
 
 
 
 
 

HARYANA
 
 
 

DELHI
 

UTTAR PRADESH
 
 
 
 
 
 
 Pt. Deen Dayal Upadhyaya Junction

BIHAR
 
 
 
 

WEST BENGAL
 New Jalpaiguri (Siliguri)
 
 

ASSAM

Traction

As the route is yet to be fully electrified, it is hauled by a Bhagat Ki Kothi Diesel Loco Shed-based WDP-4 locomotive from Bhagat Ki Kothi whole the journey until Kamakhya.

Coach composition

The train consists of 18 coaches:

 2 AC II Tier
 4 AC III Tier
 7 Sleeper coaches
 4 General
 2 Second-class Luggage/parcel van

Timing

15623 – Leaves Bhagat Ki Kothi (Rajasthan) every Tuesday and reaches Kamakhya Junction (Assam) Thursday at 23:05 hrs IST
15624 – leaves Kamakhya Junction (Assam) every Friday at 15:15 hrs and reaches Bhagat Ki Kothi (Rajasthan) Sunday at 22:0 hrs IST

See also 

 Barmer–Guwahati Express

References

External links 
 15623/Bhagat Ki Kothi - Kamakhya Express
 15624/Kamakhya - Bhagat Ki Kothi Weekly Express

Rail transport in Rajasthan
Rail transport in Haryana
Rail transport in Delhi
Rail transport in Bihar
Rail transport in Uttar Pradesh
Rail transport in West Bengal
Rail transport in Assam
Express trains in India
Transport in Guwahati
Transport in Jodhpur
Railway services introduced in 2016
2016 establishments in India